The Torleite Formation is a geologic formation and Lagerstätte in Germany. It preserves fossils dating back to the Kimmeridgian stage of the Jurassic period. examples of animals that lived in the formation include the a small primitive megalosaurid theropod dinosaur known as Sciurumimus and the extinct bony fish Anaethalion.

Fossil content 
The following fossils have been reported from the formation:

Crocodylomorphs 
 Alligatorium franconicum (=Neosuchia indet.)
Cricosaurus bambergensis
 Dakosaurus maximus
 Cricosaurus sp.

Dinosaurs 
 Sciurumimus albersdoerferi

Pterosaurs 

 Balaenognathus maeuseri

Turtles 
 Eurysternum wagleri

Rhynchocephalians 

 Sphenofontis velserae

Fish 
 Anaethalion sp.
 Leptolepides sp.
 Leptolepis sp.
 Pholidophorus sp.
 Pleuropholis sp.

See also 
 List of fossiliferous stratigraphic units in Germany

References

Bibliography 
 
  
 

Geologic formations of Germany
Jurassic System of Europe
Jurassic Germany
Kimmeridgian Stage
Limestone formations
Lagoonal deposits
Reef deposits
Shallow marine deposits
Lagerstätten
Fossiliferous stratigraphic units of Europe
Paleontology in Germany
Formations